The Ambassador of the United Kingdom to Montenegro is the United Kingdom's foremost diplomatic representative in Montenegro and head of the 
United Kingdom's diplomatic mission in Podgorica.

The principality (and later Kingdom) of Montenegro was independent from 1878 to 1918, during which there was a British Minister Resident at Cetinje, the royal capital.

Following the breakup of Yugoslavia in 1991, the republics of Serbia and Montenegro together established a federation as the Federal Republic of Yugoslavia (FRY). In 2003 the FRY was reconstituted as a state union officially known as the State Union of Serbia and Montenegro. The British Ambassador to Serbia was also accredited to Montenegro. The union was dissolved in June 2006 when Serbia and Montenegro declared themselves independent countries, and a British embassy was then established in Podgorica.

Ministers Resident 
 1893–1906: Mr Robert John Kennedy, CMG

Ambassadors 
 2006–2007: Mr John Dyson MVO
 2007–2009: Mr Kevin Lyne
 2009–2013: Ms Catherine (Kate) Knight-Sands
 2013–2017: Mr Ian Whitting OBE 

 2017–: Ms Alison Kemp
 2020: Ms Karen Maddocks

References

External links 
UK in Montenegro, Foreign & Commonwealth Office

Montenegro
 
United Kingdom ambassador